Georgy Borisovich Gabulov (born 4 September 1988) is a Russian former footballer. He played as an attacking midfielder.

Club career

Career statistics

Notes

Personal life
He is a younger brother of Vladimir Gabulov.

Honours

Lokomotiv
2007: Russian Cup

Rostov
2013–14: Russian Cup

External links

1988 births
People from Mozdoksky District
Living people
Russian footballers
Russia under-21 international footballers
Russia national football B team footballers
Association football midfielders
FC Lokomotiv Moscow players
FC Spartak Vladikavkaz players
FC Anzhi Makhachkala players
FC Rostov players
PFC Krylia Sovetov Samara players
FC SKA-Khabarovsk players
FC Metalurgi Rustavi players
Russian expatriate footballers
Expatriate footballers in Georgia (country)
Russian Premier League players
Ossetian people
Ossetian footballers
FC Orenburg players
Sportspeople from North Ossetia–Alania